The Yorkshire Coast Line is a modern term for the Hull to Scarborough railway line.

Yorkshire Coast Line can also refer to:

The coastline of Yorkshire
For East Riding of Yorkshire see Holderness and Humber Estuary, also Flamborough Head and Spurn
For North Yorkshire see North York Moors, also River Tees
For coastal railway lines in North Yorkshire see
Scarborough and Whitby Railway
Whitby, Redcar and Middlesbrough Union Railway
For lines to the coast in the East Riding of Yorkshire see
Hull and Holderness Railway
Hull and Hornsea Railway